The Jaguari River (Canastra River) is a river in the state of Rio Grande do Sul in southern Brazil. It is a tributary of the Canastra River, and therefore indirectly of the Caí River.

See also
List of rivers of Rio Grande do Sul

References

Rivers of Rio Grande do Sul